Families First is a non-profit family service agency that serves the State of Georgia and assists over 40,000 children and families each year with solutions that aim to improve child well-being and family self-sufficiency. The program dates to 1890, beginning as an orphanage for homeless girls.

Mission
Since its inception in 1890, the agency has addresses community needs such as abandoned, abused and neglected children; teen pregnancy; domestic violence; poverty; health issues; homelessness and broken families.

Families First's mission is to ensure the success of children in jeopardy by empowering families. The agency aims to focus on three impact areas:
 Child & Youth Permanency: believing that every child is entitled to a safe, secure environment with unconditional love from at least one adult, the agency offers adoption services, foster care and residential group homes for youth.
 Family Sustainability and Empowerment: the agency works collaboratively with other agencies including the Atlanta Housing Authority to provide long-term self-sufficiency through housing and support services for chronically homeless families.
 Healthy Families and Relationships: training and affordable counseling solutions are provided to young parents and families that equip them with critical skills necessary for building strong, healthy relationships.

Families First is a member of the Crittenton family of agencies.

See also

Notes

External links
 Families First

Non-profit organizations based in Georgia (U.S. state)
Organizations established in 1890